Mitro is both a masculine given name and a surname. People with the name include:

Surname 
György Mitró (1930–2010), Hungarian swimmer
Kristaq Mitro (born 1948), Albanian film director and academic

Given name
Mitro Makarchuk, known as Mac Makarchuk (1929–2021), Canadian politician and journalist
Mitro Repo (born 1958), Finnish priest

Fictional characters
Mitro, one of the main characters in the 2009 Indian movie Jag Jeondeyan De Mele

Masculine given names